This is a list of the 33 counties of Scotland by their highest point.

See also
List of counties of Scotland 1890–1975

References

www.hill-bagging.co.uk

Highest point
Counties
 
Scottish counties